Giraffaphaenops clarkei is a species of beetle in the family Carabidae, the only species in the genus Giraffaphaenops.

References

Trechinae